William Morgan was a professional rugby league footballer who played in the 1910s. He played at club level for Warrington (Heritage № 168), as a forward, during the era of contested scrums.

Playing career

Club career
William Morgan made his début for Warrington on 3 September 1910 and he played his last match for Warrington on 4 March 1911.

References

External links
Search for "Morgan" at rugbyleagueproject.org
Statistics at wolvesplayers.thisiswarrington.co.uk

Place of birth missing
Place of death missing
Rugby league centres
Warrington Wolves players
Year of birth missing
Year of death missing